Michael O'Reilly (born circa 1690, died 1758) was an Irish prelate of the Roman Catholic Church. He served as Bishop of Derry from 1739 to 1749 and Archbishop of Armagh from 1749 to 1758.

Born in Co. Cavan, he studied theology in Paris and was ordained in 1710. He served as parish priest in cavan.

He was Rector of Drogheda, and was recommended as the Bishop of Derry by James Francis Edward Stuart on 10 April 1739. His papal brief was dated 24 April 1739 and his episcopal ordination took place on 23 September 1739. The following year, he was one of the assisting bishops at the consecration of Francis Stuart, Bishop of Down and Connor. O'Reilly was translated to the Metropolitan see of Armagh as archbishop and primate on 23 January 1749.

He died in office in 1758, and was buried near Drogheda.

References

Bibliography

 
 

1758 deaths
18th-century Roman Catholic archbishops in Ireland
Roman Catholic bishops of Derry
Roman Catholic archbishops of Armagh
Year of birth unknown
People from County Cavan